Enoticumab (REGN421, INN) is a human monoclonal antibody that binds to DLL4. It acts as an immunomodulator.

References 

Monoclonal antibodies
Experimental cancer drugs